Bolma venusta is a species of sea snail, a marine gastropod mollusk in the family Turbinidae, the turban snails.

Description
The height of the shell attains 15 mm.

Distribution
This marine species occurs off the Philippines and Japan.

References

External links
 To Encyclopedia of Life
 To World Register of Marine Species
 

venusta
Gastropods described in 1964